The Mockingboard (a pun on "Mockingbird") is a sound card built by Sweet Micro Systems for the Apple II series of microcomputers.  It improves on the Apple II's limited sound capabilities, as did other Apple II sound cards.

In 1981, Sweet Micro Systems began designing products not only for creating music, but speech and general sound effects as well, culminating in the release of the Mockingboard in 1983. The Mockingboard's hardware allowed programmers to create complex, high-quality sound without need for constant CPU attention. The Mockingboard could be connected to the Apple's built-in speaker or to external speakers. However, as the quality of the built-in speaker was not high, the instruction manual recommended obtaining external speakers.

The Mockingboard was available in various models for either the slot-based Apple II / Apple II Plus / Apple IIe systems or in one special model for the Apple IIc.  Sound was generated through one or more AY-3-8910 or compatible sound chips, with one chip offering three square-wave synthesis channels. The boards could also be equipped with an optional speech chip (a Votrax SC-01 or compatible chips such as the Arctic-02, SSI 263P, SSI 263AP or 78A263A-P).

Some software products supported more than one Mockingboard. Ultima V supported two boards, for a total of 12 voices, of which it used eight. Most other programs supported at most one board with six voices.

Applied Engineering's Phasor was compatible with the Mockingboard. It had 4 sound chips and thus provided 12 audio channels. Few programs supported using it for more than six voices, however.

An IBM PC-compatible version was developed, but was only distributed with Bank Street Music Writer.

Models

Early models

 Sound I: one AY-3-8910 chip for three audio channels
 Speech I: one SC-01 chip
 Sound II: two AY-3-8910 chips for six audio channels
 Sound/Speech I: one AY-3-8910 and one SC-01

Later models
 Mockingboard A: two AY-3-8913 chips for six audio channels and two open sockets for SSI-263 speech chips
 Mockingboard B: SSI-263 speech chip upgrade for Mockingboard A
 Mockingboard C: two AY-3-8913 and one SSI-263 ("A+B=C", essentially a Mockingboard A with the Mockingboard B upgrade pre-installed, only one speech chip allowed)
 Mockingboard D: for Apple IIc only, not software compatible with the other Mockingboards, two AY-3-8913 and one SSI-263
 Mockingboard M: Bundled with Mindscape's Bank Street Music Writer, with two AY-3-8913 chips and an open socket for one speech chip.  This model included a headphone jack and a jumper to permit sound to be played through the Apple's built-in speaker.

Other compatible cards
Echo+: emulates 1 x Mockingboard card, two AY-3-8913 for six channels, speech is provided by a Texas Instruments TMS5220NL Speech Synthesizer, compatibility with SC-01 or SSI-263 unknown.
 Mustalgame Card: Mockingboard clone from Capital Computer Co (Hong Kong) with two AY-3-891x chips. Integrated Software Automatic Mouth (S.A.M.) for speech synthesis. Amplifies Apple II speaker sound without need for interconnecting cable.
 Phasor: emulates 2 × Mockingboard cards with optional voice support, 1 x ALF Music Card. Developed by Applied Engineering.

Modern cards
 Mega Audio: emulates 2 x Mockingboard cards without voice support, 1 x ALF Music card, 4 x S.A.M.-cards (4 x DAC). Developed by A2Heaven.
 Mockingboard v1: A clone of the Mockingboard A from ReactiveMicro.com
 Mockingboard v2.2: The Mockingboard is a 6 voice sound card for the Apple II/IIplus, IIe, IIGS family of computers.  Developed by ReActiveMicro.
 Mockingboard for IIc: This Mockingboard variant is software compatible with the other Mockingboard A/C without voice. Special designed  for the Apple IIc. install on the CPU socket. Used two AY-3-8912 and CPLD for IO Bus interface. Developed by Ian Kim in Korea.
 SD Music card: First FM sound card for Apple II, Used a YM2413 and ATmega128 to emulate Mockingboard A/C without voice support. It provide Maximum nine voices and provide direct register control for YM2413. Developed by Ian Kim in Korea.
 SD Music Deluxe (OPL3): OPL3(YMF262) Mockingboard I/II/A/C emulated soundcard, Stereo sound and user defined instruments voice channels, Direct control for RAW data. VGM player supported. Developed by Ian Kim in Korea.

See also 
 Apple II peripheral cards

References

External links
 Mockingboad Mini-Manual
 Detailed Mockingboard info, software compatibility table, and data sheets for programming information

Speech synthesis
Sound cards
Apple II peripherals